José Gil Gordillo (born 9 October 1960), sometimes known as Flaco Gil, is a retired Spanish football player who played as a winger. He made 137 appearances in La Liga for Celta Vigo in the 1990s, scoring five goals.

Career

Gil was born in Sanlúcar de Barrameda in Cádiz province, part of the autonomous community of Andalusia, and began his career with local side Cádiz CF. He left to join Barcelona in 1980, playing exclusively for their B team, Barcelona Atlètic, over the next five seasons. He signed for Atlètic's Segunda División rivals Deportivo La Coruña in 1985, and was a key part of the team for six years, during which time he amassed 235 appearances and 33 goals. During a home match against Recreativo de Huelva at Estadio Riazor on 11 December 1988, he was forced to play in goal for the last few minutes after goalkeeper Jorge García was sent off. His first task was to face the resulting penalty, which was fired off target by Melenas. Gil kept a clean sheet throughout stoppage time as Depor held on for a 2–1 victory.

Gil helped Deportivo to fourth place in 1989–90, qualifying them for a promotion playoff. They faced Tenerife, and were defeated thanks to a single goal in the second leg at Estadio Riazor, and thus remained in the second tier. The following season was even better, with Depor finishing as runners-up, just a point behind champions Albacete Balompié, and earning promotion to La Liga for the first time since 1972–73.

However, Gil would not join the club in the top flight, as he left to join local rivals Celta Vigo that summer. Celta, under coach Txetxu Rojo, followed Deportivo's lead by earning promotion to La Liga in Gil's first season, and the man from Cádiz played a key part. Used in partnership with fellow midfielders Vicente or Fabiano, Gil regularly provided assists for Vladimir Gudelj, who finished the season as the division's top scorer. Los Celestes went one better than Depor had the previous year by also becoming Segunda División champions. This time he did manage to make his top division debut, which curiously came in the Galician derby against his former club Deportivo. The match, held at Estadio Riazor, ended in a 2–0 defeat for Celta.

Gil continued to be an indispensable part of the team that season, playing 36 matches. He also netted his first top flight goal on 11 April, scoring in a 1–1 away draw with Atlético Madrid at Vicente Calderón Stadium. Celta finished the season in a creditable 11th place. In 1993–94, Gil had his busiest season at the club, making 41 appearances, including helping Los Celestes reach the final of the Copa del Rey. Gil replaced Milorad Ratković after an hour in the final, held at Vicente Calderón Stadium, which ultimately ended with Celta's defeat on penalties by Real Zaragoza after a 0–0 draw.

Gil also played 40 times during the following season, before his appearances started to diminish due to injury problems during the 1995–96 season. He made his last appearance for Los Celestes in the final match of that season, a 1–1 home draw with Valencia at Balaídos on 25 May, as did his long-time midfield partner Vicente. He left Celta after 186 appearances and eight goals in five successful seasons. He rounded out his career with a single season at Racing de Ferrol in Segunda División B, before retiring in 1997 as he approached his 37th birthday.

Honours
Deportivo La Coruña
Segunda División runners-up: 1990–91

Celta Vigo
Segunda División: 1991–92
Copa del Rey runners-up: 1993–94

Career statistics

1. Appearances in the 1983 Copa de la Liga Segunda División
2. Appearance in the 1989–90 Segunda División promotion playoff

References

External links
 
 "FLACO" GIL at yojugueenelcelta.com
 

1960 births
Living people
People from Sanlúcar de Barrameda
Sportspeople from the Province of Cádiz
Footballers from Andalusia
Spanish footballers
Association football wingers
Association football midfielders
Cádiz CF players
FC Barcelona Atlètic players
Deportivo de La Coruña players
RC Celta de Vigo players
Racing de Ferrol footballers
La Liga players
Segunda División players
Segunda División B players